Epigyphantes is a monotypic genus of Asian dwarf spiders containing the single species, Epigyphantes epigynatus. It was first described by Michael I. Saaristo & A. V. Tanasevitch in 2004, and has only been found in Russia.

See also
 List of Linyphiidae species (A–H)

References

Linyphiidae
Monotypic Araneomorphae genera
Spiders of Russia